Goodrich School is a historic school building located in Colonie in Albany County, New York.  It consists of a one-story, gable roofed rectangular brick building built about 1922 with a one-story, rectangular hipped roof wing dated to about 1926.  On the south side are a series of two additions completed during the 1950s.  The building is in the Classical Revival style and features a prominent portico with curved underside supported by six Doric order fluted columns.  Atop the roof is an octagonal wood cupola with a copper roof.

It was listed on the National Register of Historic Places in 2000.

Gallery

References

School buildings on the National Register of Historic Places in New York (state)
Neoclassical architecture in New York (state)
School buildings completed in 1922
Schools in Albany County, New York
National Register of Historic Places in Albany County, New York
1922 establishments in New York (state)